Robert "Bob" Glasgow is a Democratic Party politician from Stephenville, Texas who held office as a member of the Senate of Texas. Glasgow is trained as a lawyer. He was the winner of the 1994 Ig Nobel Prize in Chemistry for sponsoring a 1989 drug law that made it illegal to buy laboratory glassware without a permit. 

Mr. Glasgow also served as President Pro Tem of the Senate, serving on many occasions as Governor of Texas and was honored in 1991 as Governor for a Day at a statewide ceremony at the State Capitol in Austin, Texas.

Robert received his B.A. from Tarleton State University and his J.D. from the University of Texas School of Law. He is a member of the Tarleton Purple Association, Erath County Bar Association, Hood County Bar Association, Parker County Bar Association, Tarrant County Bar Association, American Bar Association, and Texas Bar Association.

References

External links

Texas Democrats
Living people
People from Stephenville, Texas
Year of birth missing (living people)